Saint Vincent and the Grenadines has appeared in 8 Summer Olympic Games. The country has never participated in the Winter Olympic Games. To date, no athlete from Saint Vincent and the Grenadines has ever won an Olympic medal.

The St Vincent and the Grenadines National Olympic Committee was formed in 1982 and recognized by the IOC in 1987.

Medal tables

Medals by Summer Games

See also
 List of flag bearers for Saint Vincent and the Grenadines at the Olympics

References

External links
 
 
 
SVGOC Official website